Ajdahak may refer to:

 Azhdaha, a dragon-like creature of Indo-Iranian mythology
 Azhdahak (Armenian mythical being)